George Gill was a Negro league first baseman in the 1930s.

Hamilton made his Negro leagues debut in 1931 with the Detroit Stars. He went on to play for the Homestead Grays and the Indianapolis ABCs, and finished his career in 1937 with the Indianapolis Athletics.

References

External links
 and Seamheads

Place of birth missing
Place of death missing
Year of birth missing
Year of death missing
Detroit Stars players
Homestead Grays players
Indianapolis ABCs (1931–1933) players
Indianapolis Athletics players
Baseball first basemen